Lanassa was the name of some ancient noble women:
 the mythical ancestress of the royal dynasty of the Molossians in Epirus. According to some accounts, she is equated with Andromache.
 Lanassa (wife of Pyrrhus), a daughter of king Agathocles of Syracuse, wife of king Pyrrhus of Epirus and later of the diadoch Demetrius I of Macedon 

Lanassa may also refer to:
 Lanassa (polychaete), a genus of polychaetes in the family Terebellidae